The Remington V3 is a gas-operated semi-automatic shotgun introduced by Remington Arms in 2015. It was recognized as an editor's choice by Sports Afield in 2015.

Design
The V3 uses Remington's patented gas-operated reloading system found in the Versa Max. The chamber that holds a shell when it is fired has a series of holes that regulate gas flow; shorter shells expose more of the holes than longer shells. While their designs are similar, the V3 and the Versa Max share no internal parts. Compared to the Versa Max, the V3 is lighter in weight and is priced lower.

Offerings
Remington offers various V3 models, some marketed as Field Sport and others as Pro. , Remington lists eight versions on their website:
 Pro: Waterfowl, Turkey
 Field Sport: Walnut, Black Synthetic, Realtree Timber, Mossy Oak Break-Up Country, Mossy Oak Blades, Mossy Oak NWTF Obsession
There are additionally two tactical offerings, the Tactical and Competition Tactical.

References

Further reading

External links
 GOGTV 2017 - Remington V3 Field Sport via YouTube

Remington Arms firearms
Semi-automatic shotguns of the United States
Weapons and ammunition introduced in 2015